Andy Whipp (born 11 March 1981 in Leamington Spa) is an English former professional squash player. He reached a career-high world ranking of 64 in June 2003. He competed multiple times in the World Open and the British Open.

References

1981 births
Living people
English male squash players